Carmelo Schembri was the chief justice of Malta from 1981 to 1987.

References 

20th-century Maltese judges
Year of birth missing
Year of death missing